Courtney Schonell (born 17 September 2000) is an Australian field hockey player, who plays as a forward.

Personal life
Courtney Schonell was born and raised in Campbelltown, New South Wales, and grew up in the neighbouring suburb of Mount Annan.

Schonell is a former student of St. Benedict's Catholic College in Oran Park.

Career

Domestic league
In Hockey Australia's premier domestic league, the Sultana Bran Hockey One, Schonell is a member of the NSW Pride. She represented the team in the inaugural season of the competition.

International

Under–21
In 2018, Schonell made her first appearance for the Australia U–21 team during a test-series against New Zealand in Hastings. Following this, she represented the team in 2019 at a Tri–Nations Tournament in Canberra, as well as a 2020 test series against Japan in Canberra.

Hockeyroos
Following a 2020 Super-Camp, Schonell was named in the Hockeyroos squad for the first time.

She will make her first appearance for the team during the 2021 Trans–Tasman Series.

References

External links
 
 

2000 births
Living people
Australian female field hockey players
Female field hockey forwards
Field hockey players at the 2018 Summer Youth Olympics
21st-century Australian women